Rio-Osayomwanbo Corkill is a professional rugby league footballer who plays as a  forward for Barrow Raiders in the RFL Championship.

He previously played for St Helens (Heritage № 1281) in the Betfred Super League.

Corkill made his first team début for Saints in August 2022 against the Wakefield Trinity .

References

External links
St Helens profile
Saints Heritage Society profile

2003 births
Living people
Barrow Raiders players
English rugby league players
Nigeria national rugby league team players
Rugby league players from Barrow-in-Furness
Rugby league second-rows
St Helens R.F.C. players